Kessai Hesa Note (born August 7, 1950, in Ailinglaplap) was President of the Marshall Islands from 2000 to 2008.

Elected in 1979 alongside Litokwa Tomeing, Note is one of the two longest-serving members of Nitijeļā. He was the Minister of Internal affairs from 1985 to 1986, and Minister of Transportation and communications from 1986 to 1987. Having served as Speaker of the Nitijeļā since 1988, he was elected president in 2000. Note is the first commoner, rather than an Iroijlaplap or traditional chief, to be elected to the Presidency. He is a member of the United Democratic Party, and was reelected by parliament in January 2004, receiving 20 votes, while Justin deBrum received 9.

On January 7, 2008, following the November 2007 general election, he was defeated in his bid for re-election in a vote of Parliament, receiving 15 votes against 18 for Litokwa Tomeing.

Note is of Japanese-Marshallese descent, having inherited his Japanese heritage from his paternal grandfather. Note's grandfather was a native of Niigata Prefecture, and settled in the Marshall Islands during the Japanese colonial era and married a Marshallese wife.

Since January 2020, he has been the Minister of Justice.

In February 2023, The Washington Post reported that Note is under investigation by the Marshall Islands' attorney general.

References

External links
 Office of the President of the Marshall Islands (Official)

1950 births
Living people
People from the Ralik Chain
Marshallese politicians of Japanese descent
Presidents of the Marshall Islands
Communication ministers of the Marshall Islands
Interior ministers of the Marshall Islands
Justice ministers of the Marshall Islands
Transport ministers of the Marshall Islands
United Democratic Party (Marshall Islands) politicians
Members of the Legislature of the Marshall Islands
Speakers of the Legislature of the Marshall Islands